The Reserve Forces Act 1899 (62 & 63 Vict. c. 40) was an Act of Parliament of the Parliament of the United Kingdom. It allowed reservists of the British Army to reside outside the United Kingdom, and to be discharged to the reserve without having to return home.

Under the Reserve Forces Act 1882, men served for a number of years as regular soldiers and then were discharged into the Army Reserve. The existing regulations stated that the Reserve existed only within the United Kingdom, and so men serving with units overseas were sent home in order to be discharged. This had been found to cause some occasional hardship, particularly when a soldier had personal ties to the area in which he was posted, and so the 1899 Act allowed a reservist to reside outside the United Kingdom. The War Office was given the power to make regulations covering this situation, which was not expected to affect a substantial number of men. It was noted that, in any case, a number of commanding officers had tacitly given permission to this arrangement, and formalising it was beneficial to all parties.

The Act was later extended by the Reserve Forces Act 1906, which explicitly allowed reservists to reside in any British protectorate or colony except the self-governing Dominions, and allowed men resident in those territories to be directly recruited into the reserves.

References

United Kingdom Acts of Parliament 1899
1899 in military history
19th-century history of the British Army
19th-century military history of the United Kingdom
United Kingdom military law